The 2016 South Dakota State Jackrabbits football team represented South Dakota State University in the 2016 NCAA Division I FCS football season. They were led by 20th-year head coach John Stiegelmeier and played their home games at their new stadium Dana J. Dykhouse Stadium. They finished the season 9–4, 7–1 in MVFC play to finish in a tie for the MVFC title. Due to their head-to-head victory over North Dakota State, they received the MVFC's automatic bid to the FCS playoffs where they defeated Villanova in the second round, before losing in the quarterfinals to North Dakota State.

Schedule

 ** Most watched FCS Game of all time - 1.98m viewers on ESPN
 R indicates Record Attendance

Game summaries

@ TCU

Drake

Cal Poly

Western Illinois

@ Southern Illinois

@ North Dakota State

Youngstown State

@ Illinois State

Missouri State

South Dakota

@ Northern Iowa

FCS Playoffs

Second Round–Villanova

Quarterfinals–North Dakota State

Ranking movements

References

South Dakota State
South Dakota State Jackrabbits football seasons
Missouri Valley Football Conference champion seasons
South Dakota State
South Dakota State Jackrabbits football